Ramirez Island is an island in the Queen Adelaide Archipelago, located west of Vidal Gormaz Islands and Rennell Islands and south of Nelson Strait.

Not to be confused with Diego Ramírez Islands, southwest of Cape Horn, that are the southernmost part of America.

See also
 List of islands of Chile
 Diego Ramírez Islands

External links
 Islands of Chile @ United Nations Environment Programme
 World island information @ WorldIslandInfo.com
 South America Island High Points above 1000 meters
 United States Hydrographic Office, South America Pilot (1916)

Queen Adelaide Archipelago
Islands of Magallanes Region

es:Isla Ramirez